The 2005 Superstars Series season was the second season of the Campionato Italiano Superstars (Italian Superstars Championship).
The championship was won by Tobia Masini driving for Audi.

Teams and drivers

Calendar

External links
Official Superstars website

Superstars Series
Superstars Series seasons